Alaattin Öner (born 30 March 2004) is a Turkish professional footballer who plays as a midfielder  for Denizlispor.

Professional career
Yıldırım is a youth product of Denizlispor, Altınordu, and Denizli Merkezspor. He was the captain of various of the Denizlispor youth sides. He made his professional debut with Denizlispor in a 5–1 Süper Lig loss to Fatih Karagümrük on 15 March 2021.

References

External links
 
 

2004 births
Living people
Sportspeople from Denizli
Turkish footballers
Denizlispor footballers
Süper Lig players
Association football midfielders